The Women's 4 × 50 metre medley relay competition of the 2014 FINA World Swimming Championships (25 m) was held on 5 December.

Records
Prior to the competition, the existing world and championship records were as follows.

Results

Heats
The heats were held at 09:30.

Final
The final was held at 18:00.

References

Women's 4 x 50 metre medley relay
2014 in women's swimming